Kelston Boys' High School ("KBHS") (Te kura tuarua o nga tamatane o kerehana) is an all-boys state secondary school in Kelston, a suburb in the Waitakere region of Auckland, New Zealand. It was created in 1963 when the roll of Kelston High School (formed in 1954) became too large for the site on the corner of Archibald  and Gt North Rds. The boys moved to a new site further down Archibald Road, leaving the original site to be the home of Kelston Girls High School (now Kelston Girls' College).

Although the school is known for the strength of its various sports teams, it has also had some notable achievements in music, dance and theatresports and produced some outstanding academic results.

The school has consistently had strong rugby teams in the top Auckland division, producing several All Blacks and international players. Kelston Boys have won the National top 4 rugby tournament five times (1989, 1995, 1996, 1999, and 2011) sharing the most wins with Wesley College. Kelston Boys have also won the Condor National sevens tournament five times (2002, 2010, 2011, 2012, 2013). The former All Black coach Graham Henry is a former headmaster. The previous principal, who retired in April 2011, Stephen Watt played for the Auckland regional team in the 1970s (where he was affectionately nicknamed 'The Kicking Prop' for his unusual goalkicking prowess). Brian Evans was the former principal; he coached the women's Black Ferns national side to rugby world cup victory in 2010.

Currently, the principal of Kelston Boys' High School is Adeline Blair, who became the first woman to head a state boys' school in Auckland. Adeline Blair has been teaching at Kelston Boys' High School since 2002 but began teaching English for adults in the school's community education division in 1996.

Long-standing Member of Parliament and Speaker of the House of Representatives Jonathan Hunt taught history at Kelston Boys'.

History

In 1954, Kelston High School, a co-educational school, was established at the modern site of Kelston Girls College. In 1963, the school separated into two, with Kelston Boys' High School at a new campus to the south.

Academia
The school offers Korean, French and Japanese courses with the option to visit a country upon completion.

The school also have Samoan, Niuean and Tongan culture groups.

Athletics
The school provides various sport activities which include:
Badminton
Basketball
Cricket
Cross country
Football
Golf
Hockey
Judo
Rugby
Softball
Sport climbing
Swimming
Tennis
Touch
Volleyball
Water polo
Weightlifting
Wrestling
Water skiing

In 1987 the school won 9–0 against Sacred Heart in Senior A1 Tennis but lost 5–4 to Auckland Grammar School. The same year, the schools softball league lost only one game in the whole season.

In 1995 the school won in debating against Western Springs AFC but lost to Green Bay.

The same year the school had excelled in soccer by winning 1–0 against Avondale, a 4–4 draw with Mount Albert Grammar School and a 6–2 victory over Mount Roskill Grammar School.

During the 1995 rugby season KBHS had won 27–0 against Papakura and had 98 wins over Rotorua Boys' High School, Te Awamutu and Morrinsville, all of which scored three each. The same year, the school won 17–0 against Saint Kentigern College in a semi-final but then lost 30–10 to Auckland Grammar School.

The school was also a winner in judo at the New Zealand Secondary Schools Championships which were held in Hamilton in August 1995 and won 4 out of 5 games in badminton.

In 1995 the Junior A3 Tennis won all five games.

In 1997 the school's trampoline diver Todd Anderson came in first place with 134.6 points while Bruce Utatao scored 78 in golf. The same year the school lost to Otahuhu College in the touch rugby final but won every other game prior to the loss.

In 2006 the school won every match in football as well as softball but lost two games in that game.

Demographics

According to the 2012 Education Review Office report the school had 949 pupils out of which 28 were international. Out of those, 20% are Māori, 13% are Pākehā, 29% are Samoan, 8% Tongan, 4% Asian, 19% are identified as Pacific Islanders, 3% are Cook Island Māori, 2% are Niuean, 8% are of other ethnicity, and 10% Indian and Fijian (5% each).

Principals
Les J. F. Colgan 1954–1965
Robert M. Bean 1965–1976
Jim R. Paton 1977–1987
Graham W. Henry 1987–1996
Stephen L. Watt 1996–2011
Brian F. Evans 2011–2018
Adeline Blair 2018–

Notable alumni

The Arts
Ewen Gilmour - comedian (and local body politician)
Ian Scott - painter
Sweet & Sour Dance Crew - World champion hip-hop dance crew

Business
Graeme Cameron - founder of Canam Construction
Michael Erceg Ph.D (dec.) - mathematician, businessman

Public service
Jack Elder - former MP & Minister of the Crown

Sport

Boxing
Danny Codling - Bronze medalist (welterweight) 2002 Manchester Commonwealth Games

Cricket
Michael Bates - Black Caps
Martin Guptill - Black Caps
Ronnie Hira - Former Black Caps
Benjamin Mailata - Samoa, former ICC East Asia-Pacific
Faasao Mulivai - Samoa, former ICC East Asia-Pacific 
Craig Spearman - Former Black Caps
Reece Young - Black Caps

Football
Jake Butler All White
Rodger Gray - NZ Captain
Danny Hay - former Walsall, Leeds, Kingz and also for Perth Glory and All White
Tony Laus - former All White
John Morris - former All White and retired Headmaster at Auckland Grammar School
Darren Young - former Barnsley FC, Football Kingz, Waterford United, Athlone Town AFC,

Rugby League
Patrick Ah Van - New Zealand Warriors
David Fusitua - New Zealand Warriors
James Gavet - New Zealand Warriors
Awen Guttenbeil - Kiwis
Ben Henry - New Zealand Warriors
Epalahame Lauaki - Kiwi, Mate Ma'a Tonga
Tuimoala Lolohea - New Zealand Warriors
Duane Mann - former Kiwis Captain
Suaia Matagi - Toa Samoa
Jarrod McCracken - former Kiwis captain
Matt Rua - former Kiwi
Iosia Soliola - Kiwis and Toa Samoa
Shalom Suniula - former Junior Kiwi
Misi Taulapapa - Toa Samoa
Va'aiga Tuigamala - Toa Samoa
Bill Tupou - New Zealand Warriors

Rugby Union
Pita Ahki- New Zealand Sevens
Steven Bates - All Blacks
Loki Crichton - Manu Samoa
DJ Forbes - current All Blacks Sevens captain
Jason Hewett - All Blacks
Nathan Hughes - London Wasps, England Rugby
James Johnston - Manu Samoa
Sione Lauaki - All Blacks, Pacific Island team member
Trevor Leota - Manu Samoa, London Wasps (England), Stade Montois (France), Cheetahs (South Africa)
Willie Los'e - Tonga
Kees Meeuws - All Blacks
Jonathan Meredith - Manu Samoa
Mils Muliaina - All Black
Apollo Perelini - Manu Samoan, North Harbour (NZ), Sale Sharks (England)
John Senio - Manu Samoa
Kevin Senio - All Blacks
Stephen Shennan - Romania
Boris Stankovich - London Irish, SC Graulhet, SC Albi, Leicester Tigers, Newport Gwent Dragons 
Andrew Suniula - US rugby
Roland Suniula - US rugby
Shalom Suniula - US rugby
Mose Tuiali'i - All Blacks
Va'aiga Tuigamala - All Blacks & Manu Samoa
Anthony Tuitavake - All Blacks
Sam Tuitupou - All Blacks
Lolagi Visinia - New Zealand Sevens

Softball
Lyndon Andrews- Black Sox
Dean Rice-Black Sox

Touch Rugby
Troy Nathan

References

External links
KBHS School Website
newzealandeducated.com

Boys' schools in New Zealand
Educational institutions established in 1963
Secondary schools in Auckland
Whau Local Board Area
1963 establishments in New Zealand
Schools in West Auckland, New Zealand